The Kent Stakes is an American Grade III race for Thoroughbred race horses, age three, run on the turf at Delaware Park Racetrack located in Stanton, Delaware.  Set at a distance of one and one eighth mile (9 furlongs), the race currently offers a purse of $200,000.

In 2011, due to heavy rain, this turf race was held on the main track.  Because of this, the number of horses contesting was reduced by scratches from 13 to 6.

First run in 1937 when Delaware Park opened, there was no Kent Stakes run in 1943, 1977–1978, 1980–1981, and 1983–1995.

Records

Speed record 
1 1⁄8 miles – 1:46.95 – Gufo (2020)

Most wins by a jockey:

 4 – Ramon Domínguez: (2001, 2003, 2005, 2010)

Most wins by a trainer:

 4 – William I. Mott: (2002, 2005, 2008, 2015)

Most wins by an owner:

 2 – Live Oak Plantation Racing: (2002, 2005)

Winners since 1999

References

External links
 The 2009 Kent Stakes at Bloodhorse.com
 2010 Delaware Park stakes schedule

Turf races in the United States
Flat horse races for three-year-olds
Horse races in Delaware
Graded stakes races in the United States
Delaware Park Racetrack
Recurring sporting events established in 1937